The 1984–85 Northeastern Huskies men's basketball team represented Northeastern University during the 1984–85 college basketball season. Led by head coach Jim Calhoun, the Huskies competed in the ECAC North Conference and played their home games at Matthews Arena. They finished the season 22–9 overall with a 13–3 mark in ECAC North play to win the regular season conference title. They followed the regular season by winning the ECAC North Conference tournament to earn a bid to the NCAA tournament as No. 14 seed in the East region. The Huskies were defeated in the opening round by No. 3 seed Illinois, 76–57.

Roster

Schedule and results

|-
!colspan=9 style=| Regular season

|-
!colspan=9 style=| ECAC North tournament

|-
!colspan=9 style=| NCAA Tournament

Awards and honors
 Reggie Lewis – ECAC North Player of the Year

References

Northeastern Huskies men's basketball seasons
Northeastern
Northeastern